The 1991 Motorcraft Quality Parts 500 was the fourth stock car race of the 1991 NASCAR Winston Cup Series and the 32nd iteration of the event. The race took place over the days of Sunday, March 17 and Monday, March 18, 1991, due to rain delays that left only the first 47 laps of the race being run on Sunday. The race was held in Hampton, Georgia, at Atlanta Motor Speedway, a  permanent asphalt quad-oval intermediate speedway. The race took the scheduled 328 laps to complete. Depending on fuel mileage, Hendrick Motorsports driver Ken Schrader would manage to stretch the final 65 laps of the race on one tank of fuel to take his third career NASCAR Winston Cup Series victory and his first victory of the season. To fill out the top three, Melling Racing driver Bill Elliott and Richard Childress Racing driver Dale Earnhardt would finish second and third, respectively.

Background 

Atlanta Motor Speedway (formerly Atlanta International Raceway) is a 1.522-mile race track in Hampton, Georgia, United States, 20 miles (32 km) south of Atlanta. It has annually hosted NASCAR Winston Cup Series stock car races since its inauguration in 1960.

The venue was bought by Speedway Motorsports in 1990. In 1994, 46 condominiums were built over the northeastern side of the track. In 1997, to standardize the track with Speedway Motorsports' other two intermediate ovals, the entire track was almost completely rebuilt. The project made the track one of the fastest on the NASCAR circuit.

Entry list 

 (R) - denotes rookie driver.

*Sponsored Alan Kulwicki in a one-race deal after their primary driver they sponsored, Mark Stahl failed to qualify.

Qualifying 
Qualifying was split into two rounds. The first round was held on Friday, March 15, at 2:00 PM EST. Each driver would have one lap to set a time. During the first round, the top 20 drivers in the round would be guaranteed a starting spot in the race. If a driver was not able to guarantee a spot in the first round, they had the option to scrub their time from the first round and try and run a faster lap time in a second round qualifying run, held on Saturday, March 16, at 10:30 AM EST. As with the first round, each driver would have one lap to set a time. For this specific race, positions 21-40 would be decided on time, and depending on who needed it, a select amount of positions were given to cars who had not otherwise qualified but were high enough in owner's points; which was usually two. If needed, a past champion who did not qualify on either time or provisionals could use a champion's provisional, adding one more spot to the field.

In the second round, Richard Childress Racing driver Dale Earnhardt would manage to beat his time with a time of 31.247; however, since the time was in the second round, Earnhardt would only garner the 21st starting position.

Two drivers would fail to qualify.

Full qualifying results

Race results

Standings after the race 

Drivers' Championship standings

Note: Only the first 10 positions are included for the driver standings.

References 

1991 NASCAR Winston Cup Series
NASCAR races at Atlanta Motor Speedway
March 1991 sports events in the United States
1991 in sports in Georgia (U.S. state)